Douglas William Woog (January 28, 1944 – December 14, 2019) was an American ice hockey coach and broadcaster. He was a member of the United States Hockey Hall of Fame, inducted in 2002. Woog was coach of the University of Minnesota Golden Gophers ice hockey team from 1985 to 1999. He was assistant coach of the 1984 U.S. Olympic ice hockey team.

He was a broadcaster for Gopher hockey games for FSN North through the 2009 to 2010 season. In 2008, he was awarded the John MacInnes Award for his work in amateur hockey in the United States. Woog died December 14, 2019.

Playing career
Woog played high school hockey for the South St. Paul Packers. Woog was a Minnesota first team all-state player three of his four years at South St. Paul, leading the Packers to four state tournament berths. Woog was the Athletes and Activity Honoree of South St. Paul high school in 1962. He was named to the Minnesota state all-tournament team three of four years and was the tournament's leading scorer in 1962. Woog's No. 7 South St. Paul High School Packer jersey was retired on February 6, 2010. Woog played for the University of Minnesota from 1963 to 1966. In his three years (freshmen were not allowed to play) with Minnesota, Woog was selected as a first team All-American, named team captain and named MVP in his senior year. Woog was a member of the U.S. national team in 1967.

Coaching
After finishing his playing career Woog began coaching in Minnesota, first, for the 1968–69 season as coach for the Hopkins West Jr. High School hockey team located in Minnetonka, Minnesota where he was a Social Studies teacher.  Then as an assistant with the Minnesota Junior Stars under former teammate and fellow Minnesota alumnus Herb Brooks. in 1973 Woog became the head coach for the St. Paul Vulcans and was the only bench boss the team had in the four years it spent in the MWJHL. In the early 1980s Woog served in many capacities for the United States men's national ice hockey team, including as an assistant at the 1984 Winter Olympics, before being named as the head coach for Minnesota. In his first twelve seasons the Golden Gophers reached the NCAA tournament each year (a record for the start of a career) posting six 30+ win seasons, winning five WCHA titles, three conference tournament titles and made the 1989 NCAA Tournament Final. While the ultimate prize eluded him Woog was one of the most successful coaches in the history of the NCAA when he retired in 1999. In 2015, in his honor they named formerly known, Wakota Arena, to Doug Woog Arena in his home town of South St. Paul.

Head coaching record

College

†Mike Guentzel served as interim coach for three games while Woog was suspended on two occasions

Awards and honors

References

External links

MacInnes Award

1944 births
2019 deaths
American ice hockey coaches
Minnesota Golden Gophers men's ice hockey coaches
People from South St. Paul, Minnesota
United States Hockey Hall of Fame inductees
Sportspeople from Saint Paul, Minnesota
Minnesota North Stars announcers
AHCA Division I men's ice hockey All-Americans
Ice hockey people from Saint Paul, Minnesota